Belverdi-ye Jadid (also Romanized as Belverdī-ye Jadīd; also known as Belverdī-ye Bālā and Belverdī-ye ‘Olyā) is a village in Cham Chamal Rural District, Bisotun District, Harsin County, Kermanshah Province, Iran. At the 2006 census, its population was 1,880, in 460 families.

References 

Populated places in Harsin County